= Latinic =

Latinic may refer to:

- adjective form of Latinica, Gaj's Latin alphabet
- adjective form of Latin languages
